Niedźwiedzkie may refer to the following places:
Niedźwiedzkie, Podlaskie Voivodeship (north-east Poland)
Niedźwiedzkie, Ełk County in Warmian-Masurian Voivodeship (north Poland)
Niedźwiedzkie, Olecko County in Warmian-Masurian Voivodeship (north Poland)